AAY may refer to:

 Aariya language, an apparently spurious language of India
 Al Ghaydah Airport in Al Ghaydah, Yemen
 Allegiant Air, an airline headquartered in Las Vegas, Nevada, United States
 Down East Yachts, an American sailboat manufacturer